The following article presents a summary of the 1988 football (soccer) season in Brazil, which was the 87th season of competitive football in the country.

Campeonato Brasileiro Série A

Quarterfinals

Semifinals

Final

Bahia declared as the Campeonato Brasileiro champions by aggregate score of 2-1.

Relegation
The four worst placed teams in the first stage, which are Bangu, Santa Cruz, Criciúma and América-RJ, were relegated to the following year's second level.

Campeonato Brasileiro Série B

Internacional-SP declared as the Campeonato Brasileiro Série B champions.

Promotion
The two best placed teams in the final stage of the competition, which are Internacional-SP and Náutico, were promoted to the following year's first level.

Relegation
The worst placed team in each one of the four groups in the first stage, which are Treze, Rio Branco-ES, Uberlândia, and Pelotas, were relegated to the following year's third level.

Campeonato Brasileiro Série C

Third Stage

Final

União São João declared as the Campeonato Brasileiro Série C champions by aggregate score of 3-3 due to better season record.

Promotion
The champion and the runner-up, which are União São João and Esportivo-MG, were promoted to the following year's first level.

State championship champions

Youth competition champions

Other competition champions

Brazilian clubs in international competitions

Brazil national team
The following table lists all the games played by the Brazil national football team in official competitions and friendly matches during 1988.

Women's football

National team
The following table lists all the games played by the Brazil women's national football team in official competitions and friendly matches during 1988.

Domestic competition champions

References

 Brazilian competitions at RSSSF
 1988 Brazil national team matches at RSSSF
 1988 Brazil women's national team matches at RSSSF

 
Seasons in Brazilian football
Brazil